Mount Pendan is an active volcano on Sumatra, Indonesia. There is little known about the volcano.

As sources and references about Mount Pendan are solely based on the Smithsonian listing which lacks further information, there are doubts about the volcano's existence. The coordinates reveal a mountain covered by dense forest. It is unclear whether Pendan is an actual volcano, a misidentified mountain or valley which may or may not be of volcanic origin, or a copyright trap fabricated by the Smithsonian Institution.

See also 

 List of volcanoes in Indonesia

References 

Pendan
Pendan
Pendan